Kyochon F&B Co., Ltd. is a South Korean fried-chicken restaurant chain. Founded in 1991, Kyochon is one of the largest Korean fried-chicken restaurants in South Korea. Kyochon operates some restaurants in the United States as well. Kyochon has its head office in Osan, Gyeongi-do. In 2015, Kyochon opened its world largest outlet in Malaysia at Pavilion KL. Kyochon had over 50 outlets nationwide.

See also
 List of fast-food chicken restaurants

References

External links
 Kyochon 

Fast-food poultry restaurants
Restaurant chains
Fast-food chains of South Korea
Restaurants established in 1991
South Korean companies established in 1991
Korean restaurants